Venetian, wider Venetian or Venetan (  or  ) is a Romance language spoken natively in the northeast of Italy, mostly in the Veneto region, where most of the five million inhabitants can understand it. It is sometimes spoken and often well understood outside Veneto: in Trentino, Friuli, the Julian March, Istria, and some towns of Slovenia and Dalmatia (Croatia) by a surviving autochthonous Venetian population, and Brazil, Argentina, Australia, Canada, the United States, the United Kingdom, and Mexico by Venetians in the diaspora.

Although referred to as an "Italian dialect" even by some of its speakers, the label is primarily geographic. Venetian is a separate language from Italian, with many local varieties. Its precise place within the Romance language family remains somewhat controversial. Both Ethnologue and Glottolog group it into the Gallo-Italic branch. Devoto, Avolio and Ursini reject such classification, and Tagliavini places it in the Italo-Dalmatian branch of Romance.

History

Like all members of the Romance language family, Venetian evolved from Vulgar Latin, and is thus a sister language of Italian and other Romance languages. Venetian is first attested in writing in the 13th century.

The language enjoyed substantial prestige in the days of the Republic of Venice, when it attained the status of a lingua franca in the Mediterranean Sea. Notable Venetian-language authors include the playwrights Ruzante (1502–1542), Carlo Goldoni (1707–1793) and Carlo Gozzi (1720–1806). Following the old Italian theatre tradition, they used Venetian in their comedies as the speech of the common folk. They are ranked among the foremost Italian theatrical authors of all time, and plays by Goldoni and Gozzi are still performed today all over the world.

Other notable works in Venetian are the translations of the Iliad by Giacomo Casanova (1725–1798) and Francesco Boaretti, the translation of the Divine Comedy (1875) by Giuseppe Cappelli and the poems of Biagio Marin (1891–1985). Notable too is a manuscript titled Dialogo de Cecco di Ronchitti da Bruzene in perpuosito de la stella Nuova attributed to Girolamo Spinelli, perhaps with some supervision by Galileo Galilei for scientific details.

Several VenetianItalian dictionaries are available in print and online, including those by Boerio, Contarini, Nazari and Piccio.

As a literary language, Venetian was overshadowed by Dante Alighieri's Tuscan dialect (the best known writers of the Renaissance, such as Petrarch, Boccaccio and Machiavelli, were Tuscan and wrote in the Tuscan language) and languages of France like the Occitano-Romance languages and the langues d'oïl.

Even before the demise of the Republic, Venetian gradually ceased to be used for administrative purposes in favor of the Tuscan-derived Italian language that had been proposed and used as a vehicle for a common Italian culture, strongly supported by eminent Venetian humanists and poets, from Pietro Bembo (1470–1547), a crucial figure in the development of the Italian language itself, to Ugo Foscolo (1778–1827).

Virtually all modern Venetian speakers are diglossic with Italian. The present situation raises questions about the language's survival. Despite recent steps to recognize it, Venetian remains far below the threshold of inter-generational transfer with younger generations preferring Italian in many situations. This extends to ongoing arrival of people who only speak or learn Italian.

Venetian spread to other continents as a result of mass migration from the Veneto region between 1870 and 1905, and between 1945 and 1960. Venetian migrants created large Venetian-speaking communities in Argentina, Brazil (see Talian), and Mexico (see Chipilo Venetian dialect), where the language is still spoken today.

In the 19th century large-scale immigration towards Trieste and Muggia extended the presence of the Venetian language eastward. Previously the dialect of Trieste had been a Ladin or Eastern Friulian dialect known as Tergestino. This dialect became extinct as a result of Venetian migration, which gave rise to the Triestino dialect of Venetian spoken there today.

Internal migrations during the 20th century also saw many Venetian-speakers settle in other regions of Italy, especially in the Pontine Marshes of southern Lazio where they populated new towns such as Latina, Aprilia and Pomezia, forming there the so-called "Venetian-Pontine" community (comunità venetopontine).

Currently, some firms have chosen to use Venetian language in advertising as a famous beer did some years ago ("only the name is foreign"). In other cases advertisements in Veneto are given a "Venetian flavour" by adding a Venetian word to standard Italian: for instance an airline used the verb  ("it is always bigger") into an Italian sentence (the correct Venetian being ) to advertise new flights from Marco Polo Airport.

In 2007, Venetian was given recognition by the Regional Council of Veneto with regional law no. 8 of 13 April 2007 "Protection, enhancement and promotion of the linguistic and cultural heritage of Veneto". Though the law does not explicitly grant Venetian any official status, it provides for Venetian as object of protection and enhancement, as an essential component of the cultural, social, historical and civil identity of Veneto.

Geographic distribution

Venetian is spoken mainly in the Italian regions of Veneto and Friuli-Venezia Giulia and in both Slovenia and Croatia (Istria, Dalmatia and the Kvarner Gulf). Smaller communities are found in Lombardy (Mantua), Trentino, Emilia-Romagna (Rimini and Forlì), Sardinia (Arborea, Terralba, Fertilia), Lazio (Pontine Marshes), Tuscany (Grossetan Maremma) and formerly in Romania (Tulcea).

It is also spoken in North and South America by the descendants of Italian immigrants. Notable examples of this are Argentina and Brazil, particularly the city of São Paulo and the Talian dialect spoken in the Brazilian states of Espírito Santo, São Paulo, Paraná, Rio Grande do Sul and Santa Catarina.

In Mexico, the Chipilo Venetian dialect is spoken in the state of Puebla and the town of Chipilo. The town was settled by immigrants from the Veneto region, and some of their descendants have preserved the language to this day. People from Chipilo have gone on to make satellite colonies in Mexico, especially in the states of Guanajuato, Querétaro, and State of Mexico. Venetian has also survived in the state of Veracruz, where other Italian migrants have settled since the late 19th century. The people of Chipilo preserve their dialect and call it , and it has been preserved as a variant since the 19th century.

In 2009, the Brazilian city of Serafina Corrêa, in the state of Rio Grande do Sul, gave Talian a joint official status alongside Portuguese. Until the middle of the 20th century, Venetian was also spoken on the Greek Island of Corfu, which had long been under the rule of the Republic of Venice.

Classification

Venetian is a Romance language and thus descends from Vulgar Latin. Its classification has always been controversial: According to Tagliavini, for example, it is one of the Italo-Dalmatian languages and most closely related to Istriot on the one hand and Tuscan–Italian on the other. Some authors include it among the Gallo-Italic languages, and according to others, it is not related to either one. Although both Ethnologue and Glottolog group Venetian into the Gallo-Italic languages, the linguists Giacomo Devoto and Francesco Avolio and the Treccani encyclopedia reject the Gallo-Italic classification.

Although the language region is surrounded by Gallo-Italic languages, Venetian does not share some traits with these immediate neighbors. Some scholars stress Venetian's characteristic lack of Gallo-Italic traits or traits found further afield in Gallo-Romance languages (e.g. French, Franco-Provençal) or the Rhaeto-Romance languages (e.g. Friulian, Romansh). On the other hand, it is worth noting that Venetian does share many other traits with its surrounding Gallo-Italic languages, like interrogative clitics, mandatory unstressed subject pronouns (with some exceptions), the "to be behind to" verbal construction to express the continuous aspect ("El ze drio manjar" = He is eating, lit. he is behind to eat) and the absence of the absolute past tense as well as of geminated consonants. In addition, Venetian has some unique traits which are shared by neither Gallo-Italic, nor Italo-Dalmatian languages, such as the use of the impersonal passive forms and the use of the auxiliary verb "to have" for the reflexive voice (both traits shared with German).

Modern Venetian is not a close relative of the extinct Venetic language spoken in Veneto before Roman expansion, although both are Indo-European, and Venetic may have been an Italic language, like Latin, the ancestor of Venetian and most other languages of Italy. The earlier Venetic people gave their name to the city and region, which is why the modern language has a similar name.

Regional variants
The main regional varieties and subvarieties of Venetian language:
 Central (Padua, Vicenza, Polesine), with about 1,500,000 speakers
Venice
Eastern/Coastal (Trieste, Grado, Istria, Fiume)
 Western (Verona, Trentino)
 Northern  of the Province of Treviso (most of the Province of Pordenone)
 North-Central  of the Province of Treviso (Belluno, comprising Feltre, Agordo, Cadore, and Zoldo Alto)

All these variants are mutually intelligible, with a minimum 92% in common among the most diverging ones (Central and Western). Modern speakers reportedly can still understand Venetian texts from the 14th century to some extent.

Other noteworthy variants are:
 the variety spoken in Chioggia
 the variety spoken in the Pontine Marshes
 the variety spoken in Dalmatia
 the Talian dialect of Antônio Prado, Entre Rios, Santa Catarina and Toledo, Paraná, among other southern Brazilian cities
 the Chipilo Venetian dialect of Chipilo, Mexico

Grammar

Like most Romance languages, Venetian has mostly abandoned the Latin case system, in favor of prepositions and a more rigid subject–verb–object sentence structure. It has thus become more analytic, if not quite as much as English. Venetian also has the Romance articles, both definite (derived from the Latin demonstrative ) and indefinite (derived from the numeral ).

Venetian also retained the Latin concepts of gender (masculine and feminine) and number (singular and plural). Unlike the Gallo-Iberian languages, which form plurals by adding -s, Venetian forms plurals in a manner similar to standard Italian. Nouns and adjectives can be modified by suffixes that indicate several qualities such as size, endearment, deprecation, etc. Adjectives (usually postfixed) and articles are inflected to agree with the noun in gender and number, but it is important to mention that the suffix might be deleted because the article is the part that suggests the number. However, Italian is influencing Venetian language:

While it may help novice speakers, Venetian was never written with this letter. In this article, this symbol is used only in Veneto dialects of Venetian language. It will suffice to know that in Venetian language the letter L in word-initial and intervocalic positions usually becomes a "palatal allomorph", and is barely pronounced.

No native Venetic words seem to have survived in present Venetian, but there may be some traces left in the morphology, such as the morpheme -esto/asto/isto for the past participle, which can be found in Venetic inscriptions from about 500 BC:

 Venetian:  ("I have done")
 Venetian Italian: 
 Standard Italian:

Redundant subject pronouns
A peculiarity of Venetian grammar is a "semi-analytical" verbal flexion, with a compulsory "clitic subject pronoun" before the verb in many sentences, "echoing" the subject as an ending or a weak pronoun. Independent/emphatic pronouns (e.g. ), on the contrary, are optional. The clitic subject pronoun is used with the 2nd and 3rd person singular, and with the 3rd person plural. This feature may have arisen as a compensation for the fact that the 2nd- and 3rd-person inflections for most verbs, which are still distinct in Italian and many other Romance languages, are identical in Venetian.

The Piedmontese language also has clitic subject pronouns, but the rules are somewhat different. The function of clitics is particularly visible in long sentences, which do not always have clear intonational breaks to easily tell apart vocative and imperative in sharp commands from exclamations with "shouted indicative". For instance, in Venetian the clitic  marks the indicative verb and its masculine singular subject, otherwise there is an imperative preceded by a vocative. Although some grammars regard these clitics as "redundant", they actually provide specific additional information as they mark number and gender, thus providing number-/gender- agreement between the subject(s) and the verb, which does not necessarily show this information on its endings.

Interrogative inflection
Venetian also has a special interrogative verbal flexion used for direct questions, which also incorporates a redundant pronoun:

Auxiliary verbs
The past participle is invariable, unlike Italian:

Continuing action
Another peculiarity of the language is the use of the phrase  (literally, "to be behind") to indicate continuing action:

Another progressive form in some Venetian dialects uses the construction  (lit. "to be there that"):

 Venetian dialect:  (lit. "My father he is there that he speaks").

The use of progressive tenses is more pervasive than in Italian; e.g.

 English: "He wouldn't have been speaking to you".
 Venetian: .

That construction does not occur in Italian: *Non sarebbe mica stato parlandoti is not syntactically valid.

Subordinate clauses
Subordinate clauses have double introduction ("whom that", "when that", "which that", "how that"), as in Old English:

As in other Romance languages, the subjunctive mood is widely used in subordinate clauses.

Phonology

Consonants 

The voiceless interdental fricative occurs in Bellunese, north-Trevisan, and in some Central Venetian rural areas around Padua, Vicenza and the mouth of the river Po.

In those dialects that have both types, the precise phonetic realization of ⟨ł⟩ depends both on its phonological environment and on the dialect of the speaker. In Venice and its mainland as well as in most of central Veneto (excluding the peripheral provinces of Verona, Belluno and some islands of the lagoon) the realization is a non-syllabic  (usually described as nearly like an "e" and so often spelled as ), when  is adjacent (only) to back vowels, vs. a null realization when  is adjacent to a front vowel.

In dialects further inland  may be realized as a partially vocalised .

The masculine singular noun ending, corresponding to -o/-e in Italian, is often unpronounced in Venetian after continuants, particularly in rural varieties: Italian  ("full") corresponds to Venetian , Italian  to Venetian . The extent to which final vowels are deleted varies by dialect: the central–southern varieties delete vowels only after , whereas the northern variety delete vowels also after dental stops and velars; the eastern and western varieties are in between these two extremes.

The velar nasal  (the final sound in English "song") occurs frequently in Venetian. Moreover, Venetian always uses  in consonant clusters that start with a nasal, whereas Italian only uses  before velar stops: e.g. "to sing",  "winter",  "to anoint",  "to cope with".

Vowels

An accented á is pronounced as [], (an intervocalic // could be pronounced as a [] sound).

Prosody
While written Venetian looks similar to Italian, it sounds very different, with a distinct lilting cadence, almost musical. Compared to Italian, in Venetian syllabic rhythms are more evenly timed, accents are less marked, but on the other hand tonal modulation is much wider and melodic curves are more intricate. Stressed and unstressed syllables sound almost the same; there are no long vowels, and there is no consonant lengthening. Compare the Italian sentence   "go there with him" (all long/heavy syllables but final) with Venetian   (all short/light syllables).

Sample etymological lexicon
As a direct descent of regional spoken Latin, Venetian lexicon derives its vocabulary substantially from Latin and (in more recent times) from Tuscan, so that most of its words are cognate with the corresponding words of Italian. Venetian includes however many words derived from other sources (such as Greek, Gothic, and German), and has preserved some Latin words not used to the same extent in Italian, resulting in many words that are not cognate with their equivalent words in Italian, such as:

Spelling systems

Traditional system
Venetian does not have an official writing system, but it is traditionally written using the Latin script — sometimes with certain additional letters or diacritics. The basis for some of these conventions can be traced to Old Venetian, while others are purely modern innovations.

Specifically:

The usage of letters in medieval and early modern texts was not, however, entirely consistent. Differences between earlier and modern pronunciation, divergences in pronunciation within the modern Venetian-speaking region, differing attitudes about how closely to model spelling on Italian norms, as well as personal preferences, some of which reflect sub-regional identities, have all hindered the adoption of a single unified spelling system.

Nevertheless, in practice, most spelling conventions are the same as in Italian. For example,  was used to represent  ("he/she kisses"), whereas  represented  ("low"). For example,  represents only , but  represents .)

Traditionally the letter  was ambiguous, having the same values as in Italian (both voiced and voiceless affricates  and ).

Regarding the spelling of the vowel sounds, because in Venetian, as in Italian, there is no contrast between tense and lax vowels in unstressed syllables, the orthographic grave and acute accents can be used to mark both stress and vowel quality at the same time: à , á , è , é , í , ò , ó , ú . Different orthographic norms prescribe slightly different rules for when stressed vowels must be written with accents or may be left unmarked, and no single system has been accepted by all speakers.

The hyphen or apostrophe is used because the combination  is conventionally used for the  sound, as in Italian spelling; e.g. ("stupid"); whereas  before a, o and u represents :  ("box"),  ("to hide"),  ("to forgive").

Proposed systems
Another recent convention is to use  (in place of older  ) for the "soft" l, to allow a more unified orthography for all variants of the language. However, in spite of their theoretical advantages, these proposals have not been very successful outside of academic circles, because of regional variations in pronunciation and incompatibility with existing literature.

More recently, on December 14, 2017, the Modern International Manual of Venetian Spelling was approved by the new Commission for Spelling of 2010. It was translated into three languages (Italian, Venetian and English) and it exemplifies and explains every single letter and every sound of the Venetian language. The graphic accentuation and punctuation systems are added as corollaries. Overall, the system was greatly simplified from previous ones to allow both Italian and foreign speakers to learn and understand the Venetian spelling and alphabet in a more straightforward way.

The American linguist Carolyn McKay proposed a writing system for that variant based entirely on the Italian alphabet. However, the system was not very popular.

Orthographies comparison

Sample texts

Ruzante returning from war
The following sample, in the old dialect of Padua, comes from a play by Ruzante (Angelo Beolco), titled  ("Dialogue of Ruzante who came from the battlefield", 1529). The character, a peasant returning home from the war, is expressing to his friend Menato his relief at being still alive:

The following sample is taken from the Perasto Speech, given on August 23, 1797, at Perasto, by Venetian Captain Giuseppe Viscovich, at the last lowering of the flag of the Venetian Republic (nicknamed the "Republic of Saint Mark").

Francesco Artico
The following is a contemporary text by Francesco Artico. The elderly narrator is recalling the church choir singers of his youth, who, needless to say, sang much better than those of today 
(see the full original text with audio):

Venetian lexical exports to English
Many words were exported to English, either directly or via Italian or French. The list below shows some examples of imported words, with the date of first appearance in English according to the Shorter Oxford English Dictionary.

See also
 Venetian literature
 Talian dialect
 Chipilo Venetian dialect
  — Venetian language magazine

Further reading

References

Bibliography

External links

 General grammar; comparison to other Romance languages; description of the Venetian dialect 
 —samples of written and spoken Venetian by Francesco Artico
 Text and audio of some works by Ruzante

 
Languages of Veneto
Languages of Friuli-Venezia Giulia
Languages of Croatia